Harrysson is a surname. Notable people with the surname include:

 Andreas Harrysson (born 1975), Swedish darts player
 Lotta Harrysson (born 1966), Swedish sailor
 Per Harrysson (born 1967), Swedish footballer
 Tim Harrysson (born 1992), Swedish ice hockey player

See also
 Harrison (name)